Kevin McDuffie (born July 6, 1965) is an American former basketball player. A 6 ft 7 in (2.01 m) tall forward, he played four seasons of college basketball with Northeastern from 1984 to 1988.

College career 
McDuffie played four seasons for Northeastern. He was the 1984–85 Rookie of the Year of the Colonial Athletic Association (CAA), was named to the First-Team All-Conference in 1988 and was the Huskies' season MVP in 1988.

Professional career 
In the 1989–1990 season, McDuffie played for BS Weert (for sponsorship reasons named Miniware Weert) in the Dutch Eredivisie. He won the league's MVP award. 

In 1992–93, McDuffie played in France with Toulouse in the second-tier LNB Pro B. He played for Donar in the 1993–1994 season. In 1994–95, he played with Aix Maurienne Savoie Basket.

References 

Living people
1965 births
American men's basketball players
Dutch Basketball League players
Donar (basketball club) players
BSW (basketball club) players
Aix Maurienne Savoie Basket players
Northeastern Huskies basketball